Aleksey Nikolayevich Apukhtin (– ) was a Russian poet, writer and critic.

Biography
Apukhtin was born in Bolkhov and came from an ancient noble family. While yet a child, he betrayed an astounding memory and a fondness for reading, especially of poetry. By the age of ten, he knew by heart the works of Pushkin and Lermontov. Besides these, his favorite poets and authors of later years were Griboyedov, Baratynsky, Tyutchev, Fet, A. Tolstoy, L. Tolstoy, Turgenev, Dostoyevsky and Ostrovsky.

In 1852, aged only 11, he entered the Imperial School of Jurisprudence in Saint Petersburg, where he was a class mate of Pyotr Ilyich Tchaikovsky, who was his exact contemporary and became a lifelong friend.  The founder, duke Peter of Oldenburg, and the director, Alexander Yazykov, took him under their personal wings.  He graduated with distinction in 1859. His work was encouraged by Turgenev and Fet.

While he was polite and courteous in the company of women, he became a witty storyteller in the company of men.  His conversation was "imbued with such wit and clothed in such attractive form that for the sake of this alone one forgot the frivolity of the contents".  He was seen as a boy genius and a second Pushkin.  But his output failed to live up to these early expectations, and he expressed little interest in making any money from his writings.  It was only in the face of lack of funds that he made any attempt to publish his poems, giving many of them as gifts to his friends, from whom they were later retrieved for a posthumous collected edition.

His friendship with Tchaikovsky was marked by cycles of disagreements and offences followed by reconciliations. Apukhtin dedicated several poems to Tchaikovsky.  Like Tchaikovsky, Apukhtin was homosexual with a weakness for younger men, and often suffered the pain of unrequited love.  But unlike Tchaikovsky, who never publicly acknowledged his sexual interests in other men, Apukhtin lived openly with his male lovers. His sexual tastes were discussed in society and ridiculed in the press.

He entered the civil service as a member of the Ministry of Justice. After two years retirement in the country (1862–64), he became associated with the Ministry of the Interior. He spent most of his life in St. Petersburg.

Apukhtin may have played a role in introducing Tchaikovsky to his future wife Antonina Milyukova.  One of Apukhtin's friends was the singer Anastasia Khvostova, who was Antonina's brother's sister-in-law.  Tchaikovsky first met Antonina at a soiree at Anastasia's home in 1865, when she was only 16.

In 1892, Tchaikovsky issued a warning to his beloved nephew Vladimir "Bob" Davydov to be wary of Apukhtin's interest in him. He was concerned that Apukhtin would seduce him, which was a source of jealousy as Davydov was also the subject of Tchaikovsky's unspoken sexual interest.

Aleksey Apukhtin suffered from obesity, shortness of breath and dropsy.  He died in Saint Petersburg on 29 August 1893, aged 52.  Grand Duke Konstantin suggested Tchaikovsky compose a requiem in honour of Apukhtin, set to Apukhtin's poem of the same name, but he declined, saying he had just completed his 6th Symphony, which was imbued with a mood similar to that in the poem, and he feared repeating himself so soon, but also because he had no desire to write any sort of Requiem.  Tchaikovsky himself was to die suddenly just over two months later.

Work
Following the traditions of amorous gypsy romance, he introduced into this genre much of his own artistic temperament. Six of his romances were set to music by Tchaikovsky These includedTo forget so soon, Does the day reign and Frenzied nights.  Sergei Rachmaninoff was another composer who set Apukhtin's words to music.

Apukhtin's reputation as a poet was further strengthened in 1886, when his Poems collection was published. In 1890 he published several prose works: Unfinished Story, Archive of the Countess D., Pavlik Dolsky's Diary. His prose was well regarded by Mikhail Bulgakov.

Books
From Death to Life (short novel), R. Frank, New York, 1917. from Archive.org
The Archive of Countess D., from Eight Great Russian Short Stories, Fawcett Publications, 1962.
Collection of Poems by Aleksey Apukhtin (English Translations)
Aleksey Apukhtin. Poems
Three Tales by Aleksey Apukhtin

Sources
 Alexander Poznansky, Tchaikovsky: The Quest for the Inner Man
 Tchaikovsky Research: Aleksey Apukhtin

Notes

References
https://web.archive.org/web/20070926215548/http://www.fdu.edu/newspubs/fdupress/Fairleigh_front.doc

External links
 

1840 births
1893 deaths
Gay poets
Russian male poets
Russian male short story writers
Imperial School of Jurisprudence alumni
Pyotr Ilyich Tchaikovsky
Writers from Saint Petersburg
Writers of Gothic fiction
19th-century writers from the Russian Empire
19th-century poets
19th-century composers
19th-century short story writers from the Russian Empire
Russian LGBT poets